Ofori Panin Fie (Okyenhene's Palace) is the royal palace of the Omanhene of Akyem Abuakwa. It is located in Kyebi, in the Eastern Region of Ghana.

The name Ofori Panin Fie is also otherwise ascribed to the kingdom's royal family as well.

History
Ofori Panin-fie is a palace that accommodates the "Hall of Justice", ancient artifacts and archival records dating back to the 15th century. It is a research centre for researchers in West African history, Ghana, and the Laws of the Akans. It appeals to tourists and researchers interested in African History and Culture.

Residential buildings in Ghana